Ultra TV was a Serbian TV channel, which started broadcasting on January 28, 2008, at 8 A.M. It also broadcast in Montenegro, Bosnia and Herzegovina and North Macedonia. It aired a diverse number of TV programs for children and teenagers. It aired cartoons (Code Lyoko, Totally Spies!, Galactik Football, etc. mostly French production and Casper, Kirarin Revolution, Johnny Test, etc.), documentaries, and soaps.

75% of it was owned by United Group, and 25% by Luxor CO d.o.o, who created this TV channel.

On July 1, 2017, the cable operator Serbia Broadband stopped distributing Ultra TV and Mini Ultra. It was only possible to get these channels through cable operators Supernova and Posta KDS (limited availability on Supernova).

On August 1, 2019, United Group closed down Ultra TV and Mini Ultra. Their replacements are Vavoom and Pikaboo.

Mini Ultra 

In 2011, Ultra gained a sister channel, Mini Ultra. A few weeks later, also known as just Mini. Mini Ultra broadcast popular shows for younger kids.

Mini Ultra closed down on the same date as Ultra, August 1, 2019.

See also 
 Minimax (TV channel)

External links 
Ultra TV's website (archived)

Television stations in Serbia
Children's television networks